Bulbophyllum longiflorum, commonly known as the pale umbrella orchid, is a species of epiphytic or lithophytic orchid. It has a creeping rhizome, widely spaced, dark green pseudobulbs with a single large, fleshy leaf, and flowers spreading in a semicircular umbel, resembling one-half of an umbrella. The flowers are canoe-shaped, greenish cream-coloured to yellowish with purple dots. It has a wide distribution and is found in parts of Africa, on islands in the Indian and Pacific Oceans, Southeast Asia, New Guinea and northern Australia.

Description
There is a long, hair-like tip on the end of the dorsal sepal. Flowering occurs between January and March in Australia, October and January in Africa and throughout the year in New Guinea.

Taxonomy and naming
Bulbophyllum longiflorum was first formally described in 1822 by Louis-Marie Aubert du Petit-Thouars in his book Histoire particulière des plantes orchidées recueillies sur les trois Iles Australes d’Afrique, de France, de Bourbon et de Madagascar.

Distribution and habitat 
The pale umbrella orchid is found in Africa, Madagascar, Mascarenes, Seychelles and on into Malaysia, New Guinea, New Caledonia, Fiji and Society and Austral Islands and Queensland. In Queensland it occurs in the Iron and McIlwraith Ranges.

Conservation
This orchid is classed as "vulnerable" under the Australian Government Environment Protection and Biodiversity Conservation Act 1999. The main threat to the species in illegal collecting by orchid enthusiasts.

References

longiflorum
Orchids of Queensland
Orchids of New Guinea
Plants described in 1822